Henry Colas was an English politician who served in the English Parliament for Guildford in January 1377. He is believed to be the father of another MP of the same name.

References

Year of birth missing
Year of death missing
English MPs January 1377
People from Guildford